The 2021 Archery Final Olympic Qualification Tournament was the final qualifying tournament for archers to qualify to the 2020 Summer Olympics at Tokyo, Japan. The tournament was held at the Charlety Stadium in Paris, France from 18 to 21 June. Paris also hosted the 2021 Archery World Cup Stage 3 from 21 to 28 June after this tournament. 

The tournament only consisted of recurve events (no compound events) as used in the 2020 Summer Olympics- men and women's individual, and the men and women's team. The two highest National Olympic Committees (NOCs) in the men's individual together with the highest NOC in the women's individual earned a spot to the Olympics; the 3 top teams in both team events also earned a spot to the Olympics and also earned each NOC on that team a place in the individual events. Due to the Oceania Continental Qualification Tournament being canceled because of the ongoing COVID-19 pandemic, the highest placing Oceanian NOC in both individual events qualified.

Participating nations
250 athletes from 68 countries participated in the tournament.

Qualification summary 
This list shows a summary of the athletes and teams that qualified to the Olympics through this tournament.

Summary

Men's individual

Qualification

Elimination

Finals

Section 1

Section 2

Section 3

Section 4

Section 5

Section 6

Section 7

Section 8

Women's individual

Qualification

Elimination

Finals

Section 1

Section 2

Section 3

Section 4

Section 5

Section 6

Section 7

Section 8

Men's team

Qualification

Elimination

Finals

Women's team

Qualification

Elimination

Finals

See also
Archery at the 2020 Summer Olympics – Qualification
Archery at the 2020 Summer Olympics

References

External links
Results book

Archery competitions in France
Olympic Qualification Tournament
2021 Archery Final Olympic Qualication Tournament
2021 Archery Final Olympic Qualication Tournament
Archery